Liolaemus islugensis the panther tree iguana is a species of lizard in the family Iguanidae.  It is found in Chile and Bolivia.

References

islugensis
Lizards of South America
Reptiles of Chile
Reptiles described in 1987